Swalwell is a hamlet in southern Alberta, Canada within Kneehill County. Previously an incorporated municipality, Swalwell dissolved from village status on January 1, 1946, to become part of the Municipal District of Norquay No. 279.

It is located on Canadian National Railway's Three Hills Subdivision between Three Hills and Beiseker.

The hamlet is located in Census Division No. 5 and the federal riding of Crowfoot.

Demographics 

See also 

List of communities in Alberta
List of designated places in Alberta
List of former urban municipalities in Alberta
List of hamlets in Alberta

References 

Kneehill County
Hamlets in Alberta
Designated places in Alberta
Former villages in Alberta